The 2013 Chinese Figure Skating Championships was held between December 20 and 21, 2012 in Harbin. Medals were awarded in the disciplines of men's singles, ladies' singles, pair skating, and ice dancing.

Results

Men

Ladies

Pairs

Ice dance

External links
 2012-2013 Annual Chinese National Ice Sports Events: Rules and Schedule
 results

2013
2012 in figure skating
2013 in figure skating
Sport in Harbin